Abdullah (December 7, 1970 – January 5, 2000) was a Trakehner stallion ridden by Conrad Homfeld. He won many international titles in the sport of show jumping, and is considered by some to be the best Trakehner ever to compete in the show-jumping ring. Abdullah was inducted into the United States Show Jumping Hall of Fame in 2009.

Life 

Abdullah was purchased by Williamsburg Farm in 1973 as a three-year-old from Gerhard Schickedanz in Unionville, Ontario, Canada.  He was originally bought as an event prospect and breeding stallion, and proved himself first in the dressage arena and then in eventing before becoming a world-class show jumper.  He was ridden by Debbie Shaffner, Joe Fargis and Conrad Homfeld.

Breeding career 

Abdullah was approved for breeding by the United States, Canada, Selle Français, Sella Italiano, Anglo European Studbook, Irish Sport Horse, Hanoverian, Trakehner, Belgium Warmblood, Belgium Sporthorse, and Oldenburg studbooks.  His progeny were extremely successful, including seven United States Equestrian Federation Horses of the Year in both the Hunter and Jumper disciplines.  He ranks third place in money won by offspring in the International Jumper Futurity and International Hunter Futurity.  He is the sire of showjumpers competing internationally in the Olympics, World Championships and World Cup Finals. Due to frozen semen, it is still possible to breed to the legendary stallion.

Eventing career 

During his eventing career, Abdullah was awarded the American Trakehner Association (ATA) Trakehner Förderverein Award in 1976 and '77.  This award is given annually to the ATA-registered purebred Trakehner who is the most successful in combined training.

Show-jumping Career 

Abdullah had an extensive international level career for fourteen years between 1979 and 1989.  He won the American Trakehner Association (ATA) Open Jumper Championships for 8 consecutive years between 1979 and 1986, as well as in 1988 and 1989.  He was also awarded the ATA Palmenblüte Award in 1980, '82, '84, '85, and '86. The Palmenblüte trophy is awarded to the "ATA purebred Trakehner who has contributed the most in competition to promote the breed in North America."  After Abdullah won the trophy for the fifth time, the first trophy was retired, with an acknowledgement of Abdullah's tremendous contributions to the Trakehner breed throughout the world, and a new trophy was put into place.

He helped the United States to the team gold, and took an individual silver at the 1984 Summer Olympics in Los Angeles.  He won the 1985 World Cup Final in Berlin. Abdullah also helped the United States to the team gold, taking individual silver, at the 1986 Show Jumping World Championships in Aachen, Germany.  Abdullah also won or placed at numerous other international level Grand Prix events.

Retirement 

The stallion died January 5, 2000, due to colic.  The Chronicle of the Horse recently honored Abdullah as one of the top 50 horses of the century.

Pedigree

References 

American show jumping horses
Individual Trakehners
Individual male horses
Horses in the Olympics
1970 animal births
2000 animal deaths